"The Holy River" is a song by American musician Prince (his stage name at that time being an unpronounceable symbol, see cover art), released as the second single from his nineteenth album, Emancipation (1996). The pop/rock-based song tells the story of spiritual enlightenment and of Prince's decision to marry Mayte Garcia. A music video was also produced to promote the single.

Releases
The UK CD single was released as a two separate discs which fit in a double jewel case that was included with the first disc. Both discs had different picture sleeves and different contents, other than a "radio edit" of "The Holy River" and edit of "Somebody's Somebody" (also from Emancipation).  Disc one also included two remixes of "Somebody's Somebody": a "Livestudio Mix" and an "Ultrafantasy Edit". Both were mostly re-recorded versions of the song with additional lyrics. Disc 2 included the previously released "The Most Beautiful Girl in the World (Mustang Mix)" and a one-minute commercial called "On Sale Now!". The UK cassette single was the same as disc 2, but without "On Sale Now".

A US promotional release was sent to pop radio stations at the same time as "Somebody's Somebody" was sent to Urban radio stations, it was also made available to consumers for free, and only through book chain, Borders Music. It was a cassette single with the previously unreleased "Welcome 2 the Dawn", advertised as being from the upcoming album The Dawn. In reality, the song was later released on The Truth. 

Excluding the re-release of "1999", "The Holy River"/"Somebody's Somebody" became his final UK Top 40 single in his lifetime.

Composition
The mid-tempo number features a guitar melody without a chorus. It climaxes in a searing guitar and Pipe organ solo.

Critical reception
British magazine Music Week rated the song three out of five, describing it as "a tasteful, restrained rock ballad stripped of funk pretension. Low-key, but still pleasant." David Sinclair from The Times wrote, "Gentle pop tune from the scandalously underrated Emancipation album."

Charts
Weekly chart performance for "The Holy River"

Weekly chart performance for "The Holy River/Somebody's Somebody"

References

1997 singles
Prince (musician) songs
NPG Records singles
EMI Records singles
Music videos directed by Prince (musician)
Song recordings produced by Prince (musician)
Songs written by Prince (musician)
1996 songs